In Gabriel's Kitchen is the debut play of Salvatore Antonio, centering on an Italian-Canadian family's reaction to their son's homosexuality.  For Gabriel, the youngest son, falling in love leads to decisions which cannot be reversed.  For Gabriel's family, the subsequent loss of their favorite child means a silence of denial and the slow crumbling of a family built on Old World morals.

The play was first produced at Buddies in Bad Times Theatre from 7–26 March 2006.  The production was directed by David Oiye.  Marc Bendavid played the title role, with Toni Ellwand playing his mother, Paul Fauteux his brother, Michael Miranda his father, and Kristopher Turner as his boyfriend.

The play went on to be translated into Italian, and was performed in October 2006, at Teatro Della Limonaia, in Florence, Italy. The script was published in May 2007.

As a playwright, Salvatore has been nominated for the 2007 Governor General's Award for English drama, for his debut work In Gabriel's Kitchen.  Mr. Antonio is currently writing a new play, as part of the Tarragon Theatre Writer's Unit.

He was the playwright-in-residence at Buddies in Bad Times for its 2004-2005 season.

US Premier of In Gabriel's Kitchen at NCTC in San Francisco 

The US premier of In Gabriel's Kitchen is slated for January 11 - February 17, 2008 at The New Conservatory Theatre Center in San Francisco, CA.  Directed by Christopher Jenkins, the US premier features Ana Bayat, Harry Breaux, Juan Carlos De La Rosa, Alex Kirschner and Brian J. Patterson.

External links 
 New Conservatory Theatre Center San Francisco
 Buddies' promotional notes
 Keith Garbian's Stage and Page article

2006 plays
Canadian LGBT-related plays
Plays set in Canada